David Sanford Gottesman (April 26, 1926 – September 28, 2022) was an American businessman and billionaire.  He founded First Manhattan Co. (FMC), and was noted for his friendship with Warren Buffett.

Early life and education
Gottesman was born to a Jewish family in New York City on April 26, 1926.  His father, Benjamin, worked as a banker and investor; his mother, Esther (née Garfunkel), played a key role in procuring the Dead Sea Scrolls for Israel. He had two siblings, Milton and Alice.  He was also a nephew of American pulp-paper merchant, financier, and philanthropist Samuel Gottesman.  The family relocated to New Rochelle, New York, during Gottesman's childhood.  He joined the US Army after high school and was first sent to Princeton University to study engineering, before being deployed to the South Pacific theater in 1945.  Upon his return from military service after an honorable discharge, he obtained a bachelor's degree from Trinity College.  He then undertook postgraduate studies at Harvard Business School, graduating with a Master of Business Administration in 1950.

Career
After graduating, Gottesman first worked at Hallgarten & Company in mergers and acquisitions for around a decade.  In 1963, he was introduced to Warren Buffett at a Wall Street club lunch by a mutual friend, who recognized their identical approach of purchasing value stocks.  They soon became good friends, playing golf with each other and having conversations every Sunday night over the phone about which stocks to invest in.  Over the next two years, Gottesman travelled often to Omaha, Nebraska, where Buffett resided, to meet during the later part of the day and discuss ideas into the early hours of the morning, with Gottesman frequently returning to New York on red-eye flights.

Gottesman later founded the investment advisory firm First Manhattan Co. in 1964.  He was also an early investor in Berkshire Hathaway.  The two firms co-invested in Diversified Retailing Co., which was established by Gottesman, Buffett, and Charlie Munger to purchase private retail companies, beginning with Hochschild Kohn's (whose president was the uncle of Gottesman's wife).  The trio soon realized they made a "terrible mistake" with that acquisition and Gottesman oversaw its reselling at only a minor loss.  Diversified later merged with Berkshire in 1978.  As of March 2021, Gottesman owned 17,202 class A shares and more than two million class B shares in Berkshire Hathaway.  This made up a sizable portion of his wealth, with Gottesman later recounting that "[t]here probably has never been a better return on any stock held for 44 years in the history of Wall Street".  He estimated that by 2012, they were worth 6,000 times their original value.  He joined the Berkshire Hathaway board of directors in 2003.

Philanthropy
In 2008, Gottesman donated $25 million to the Albert Einstein College of Medicine. This gift was used to form the Ruth L. and David S. Gottesman Institute for Stem Cell Biology and Regenerative Medicine, which operates as a stem cell research center.  He and his wife also funded the Train Track Park's bicycle path around Jerusalem.  The Gottesman Hall of Planet Earth at the American Museum of Natural History is named in their honor.

Personal life
Gottesman married Ruth (née Levy) in 1950.  They met in 1948 before she began her studies at Mount Holyoke College and remained married for 72 years until his death.  She has a bachelor's from Barnard College, and a master's degree in Developmental Education and an Ed.D. in Human Cognition and Learning in the area of Educational Psychology both from Teachers College, Columbia University. Together, they had three children.  They lived in Rye, New York.  He was an avid swimmer, and was a trustee of the Mount Sinai Medical Center and was Vice Chairman and trustee of the American Museum of Natural History.

Gottesman died at his home in Rye on September 28, 2022, at the age of 96.

References

External links
 Forbes profile, 2007

1926 births
2022 deaths
20th-century American Jews
21st-century American Jews
American billionaires
American money managers
Businesspeople from New York City
Directors of Berkshire Hathaway
Gottesman family
Harvard Business School alumni
Military personnel from New York City